Tang Haoming (born October 1946), also known as Deng Yunsheng, is a Chinese novelist. He is best known for writing biographical novels of Zeng Guofan, Zhang Zhidong, and Yang Du. He is now the vice president of Hunan Writers Association.

Biography
Tang was born in 1946 in Hengyang, Hunan, which was also the hometown of Wang Fuzhi. His father Tang Zhenchu (1914–1999) was a member of the Central Committee of the Kuomintang and official in the National Government. His mother named Wang Dehui. His elder brother Tang Yiming (born 1942) is a scholar on Wei and Jin dynasties literature who graduated from Wuhan University and Columbia University. His elder sister Tang Shuming died of dysentery during the Land Reform Movement in the 1950s. In 1949, before moving to Taiwan, Tang's parents entrusted their children to Tang Zhenchu's elder brother Tang Xuanzu. In the Land Reform Movement, Tang Xuanzu was brought to be persecuted because he was a landlord. Shortly after, Tang Haoming was adopted by Deng Xianhong, a hairdresser of Hengyang No. 2 Middle School, and renamed Deng Yunsheng.

He was a graduate student in water conservancy at the Central China College of Water Conservancy. After graduation, he worked in a farm and hydropower station as a technician.

In 1966, the Cultural Revolution was launched by Mao Zedong, at this time, he read the Twenty-Four Histories. With the resumption of the University Entrance Examination in 1977, he was accepted to the Central China Normal University and graduated in 1982. After graduation, he worked in Yuelu Publishing House as an editor.

In 1986, Tang became famous for his novel, Zeng Guofan. In 2002, Tang published the novel Zhang Zhidong. He no longer writes, so this book has become his last novel.

He became president of Hunan Writers Association in September 2004, and was re-elected in June 2011.

Works
 Zeng Guofan
 Yang Du
 Zhang Zhidong

Awards
 1st National Young and Middle-aged Excellent Editor (1994)
 3rd National Book Award (1997)
 Excellent Novel Prize (1998)
 1st Yao Xueyin Historical Novel Prize (2003)

References

1946 births
Living people
Central China Normal University alumni
People from Hengyang
Writers from Hunan